Red Star was an unincorporated community in Letcher County, Kentucky, United States. It is described as being a coal camp or coal town.

References

Unincorporated communities in Letcher County, Kentucky
Unincorporated communities in Kentucky
Coal towns in Kentucky